Aghaboe, or Aughavoe, is a civil parish in County Laois.
It lies partly in the barony of Clarmallough and partly in the barony of Clandonnagh.

Church of Ireland parish
As with other civil parishes in Ireland, the civil parish of Aghaboe was derived from, and is co-extensive with, a pre-existing ecclesiastical parish of the Church of Ireland. However, due to reorganization of the church, the ecclesiastical parish no longer exists, having been subsumed into the parish of Rathdowney in the Diocese of Cashel and Ossory.

The  historian, antiquary and topographer, Edward Ledwich was a vicar of the Church of Ireland parish; he was appointed in 1772 and must have resigned in 1797 as his successor was appointed in that year.

Early Irish church

In the early Irish church, a parish was an ecclesiastical unit of territory based on the Gaelic territorial unit called a túath or on early Christian and monastic settlements.
In the case of Aghaboe, the parish seems based on the ministry of the early mediaeval Abbey of Aghaboe, whose Irish language name, Achadh Bhó,  means "Ox's Field".

Townlands

The townlands that make up the parish are:

Aghaboe
Anster
Ardvarney
Ballybrophy
Ballycolla Town
Ballycuddahy
Ballygarvan Glebe
Ballygeehin Lower
Ballygeehin Upper
Ballygowdan
Ballyhinode
Ballykeevan
Ballyowen
Ballyreilly
Barnasallagh
Baunbrack
Baunoge
Boherard
Borris-in-Ossory Town
Bushfield
Cappagh
Carrowreagh
Chapelhill
Coolbally
Coolfin
Corraun
Cross
Cruell
Cuffsborough
Dairyhill
Delligabaun
Derrin
Derrinoliver
Derrinsallagh
Derryvorrigan
Doon
Farraneglish Glebe
Fearagh
Friarsland
Garryduff
Gortnaclea
Gortnagroagh
Grange Beg
Grange More
Grantstown
Keelough Glebe
Kilbeg
Kilcotton
Kildellig
Kilminfoyle
Kilnaseer
Knockamullin
Knockaroe
Knockfin
Knockkyle
Knockseera
Kyletilloge
Leap
Legaun
Lismore
Maghernaskeagh
Middlemount
Moanfad
Oldglass
Palmershill
Park
Sentryhill
Shanboe
Skeagh
Springfield
Tinnaragh
Tinnaraheen
Tintore
Tooreagh
Townparks

References

Civil parishes of County Offaly